The National Ice Hockey League is the top men's ice hockey league in Spain. Its governing body is the Royal Spanish Ice Sports Federation.

History
Liga Nacional de Hockey Hielo was established in 1972 as the Superliga Española de Hockey Hielo. There were six founding teams which participated in the first season, 1972–73: Real Sociedad, CH Jaca, CH Valladolid, CG Puigcerdà, CH Madrid and CF Barcelona.

In 2011, the league was composed of eight teams, but due to financial problems in almost all clubs, the league has reduced the number of participants year after year until only five of them were left. In the season 2021/2022 in order to grow ice hockey in Spain, two teams composed of non-Spanish people, and one composed of Spanish players, joined the league, bringing the number of teams back to eight, with the door open to new ones in the future.

Competition

Format
The regular season of Liga Nacional de Hockey Hielo takes place between September and February, with every team playing each other three times (two in home and one away or one home and two away) for a total of 21 matches. Points are awarded according to the following:
3 points for a win
2 points for a win in extra time
1 point for a loss in extra time
0 points for a loss

Playoffs
Upon completion of the regular season, the top four teams play in the championship playoffs. The playoffs are a best of three series, in the semifinals (where 4th plays against 1st, and 3rd plays against 2nd), and a best of five in the final.

Champions by season

 1973: Real Sociedad HH
 1974: Real Sociedad HH
 1975: Real Sociedad HH
 1976: CHH Txuri Urdin
 1977: Casco Viejo Bilbao
 1978: Casco Viejo Bilbao 
 1979: Casco Viejo Bilbao
 1980: CHH Txuri Urdin 
 1981: Casco Viejo Bilbao
 1982: Casco Viejo Bilbao 
 1983: Casco Viejo Bilbao
 1984: CH Jaca
 1985: CHH Txuri Urdin
 1986: CG Puigcerdà 
 1987: FC Barcelona (1)
 1988: FC Barcelona (2)
 1989: CG Puigcerdà
 1990: CHH Txuri Urdin
 1991: CH Jaca
 1992: CHH Txuri Urdin
 1993: CHH Txuri Urdin
 1994: CH Jaca
 1995: CHH Txuri Urdin
 1996: CH Jaca
 1997: FC Barcelona

 1998: Majadahonda HC
 1999: CHH Txuri Urdin
 2000: CHH Txuri Urdin
 2001: CH Jaca
 2002: FC Barcelona
 2003: CH Jaca
 2004: CH Jaca
 2005: CH Jaca
 2006: CG Puigcerdà 
 2007: CG Puigcerdà 
 2008: CG Puigcerdà 
 2009: FC Barcelona
 2010: CH Jaca
 2011: CH Jaca
 2012: CH Jaca
 2013: Escor Auto Avendaño
 2014: Escor BAKH
 2015: CH Jaca
 2016: CH Jaca
 2017: Txuri Urdin
 2018: Txuri Urdin
 2019: Txuri Urdin
 2020: CG Puigcerdà
 2021: FC Barcelona
 2022: FC Barcelona

(1) Under 20 category

(2) Under 21 category

Titles by team

References

External links
Federación Española de Deportes de Hielo 
Hockey sobre Hielo Website

 
Top tier ice hockey leagues in Europe
Ice